Peter Bogstad Mandel (9 May 1924 – 25 February 1945) was a member of the Danish resistance killed by the German occupying power.

Biography 

Mandel was born 9 May 1924 as the first child of assistant Carl Leonhard Bogstad Mandel and wife Aase Nicoline née Kihl and baptized in Mariendal Church on 15 July the same year.

In 1930 Mandel lived with his parents in their apartment on Dronning Olgasvej 39-2, Frederiksberg, his father supported the family as an office manager at Magasin du Nord.

In 1939 on the first Sunday after Easter Mandel was confirmed in Mariendal Church.

On 25 February 1945 Mandel died of his wounds in the German medical clinic at Nyelandsvej, Frederiksberg Hospital.

After his death 

After the liberation Mandel's remains were exhumed at Ryvangen and transferred to the Department of Forensic Medicine of the university of Copenhagen.

On 7 July 1945 a memorial service was held for him in Mariendal Church where he had been baptized and confirmed.

On 29 August 1945 Mandel and 105 other victims of the occupation were given a state funeral in the memorial park founded at the execution and burial site in Ryvangen where his remains had been recovered. Bishop Hans Fuglsang-Damgaard led the service with participation from the royal family, the government and representatives of the resistance movement.

Peter Bogstad Mandel is named on memorial plaques at three schools on Frederiksberg.

References 

1924 births
1945 deaths
People executed by Nazi Germany by firing squad
Danish resistance members
Resistance members killed by Nazi Germany
Danish civilians killed in World War II